Machine is a 2017 Indian romantic thriller film, directed by Abbas–Mustan. The film stars debutant Mustafa Burmawalla and Kiara Advani. The film has been produced by Jayantilal Gada, Haresh Patel (AD Films), Pranay Chokshi, Abbas Mustan Films Productions and Dhaval Jayantilal Gada. 

The movie released on 17 March 2017. The movie was extensively shot in Georgia.

Plot
Machine depicts the story of racing enthusiasts Sarah (Kiara Advani), the daughter of a very rich businessman Balraj (Ronit Roy), and Ransh (Mustafa Burmawalla), who meet each other due to circumstances. Sarah loses to Ransh at a car race event, Sarah later finds out Ransh, new in town, is her new classmate. As their bond becomes stronger, they eventually fall in love. After the accidental death of Sarah's friend/secret lover Aditya (Eshan Shanker), they get married. However, Ransh deceives Sarah and tries to kill her for her money and property by throwing her off a cliff. She is eventually saved by Aditya's twin brother Raj (Eshan Shanker), who is a commando in the Indian Army. Sarah and Raj come to know the exact reason about her killing when they find out Ransh was doing all this on someone's orders and is duping another rich businessman's daughter. They trace him and find that her own father had planned all these due to a very convoluted reason. He is not Sarah's biological father and is Ransh's biological father. They come to know that he only raised her as his own daughter for her wealth. He even kills Sarah's parents by planning it like an accident. When he was about to pull his gun to shoot her, Sarah shoots him and burns him alive with the money he looted. They both eventually try to take revenge from Ransh. Sarah tells that she is deeply in love with him. Ransh does whatever is fitted into his mind, whatever instructed, he never realized her love for him and tried to murder her. After this, when Ransh understands, he comes forward, Raj sees the gun lying beside Ransh and throws a knife for safety of Sarah, and Ransh realizes what he actually is. He realizes that he has his own brain and heart. At the end, Ransh understands he is truly in love with Sarah, and dies, confessing his true love for her.

Cast 
 Kiara Advani as Sarah Thapar, Balraj's adopted daughter
 Mustafa Burmawalla as Ransh, Balraj's biological son 
 Eshan Shanker as Aditya / Raj 
 Ronit Roy as Balraj, Sarah's adopted father, Ransh's biological father
 Sharat Saxena as Advocate Kapoor
 Johnny Lever as Darpan Gopal (Police Officer) (cameo appearance)
 Vivek Vaswani as Mr. Thapar, Sarah’s biological Grandfather 
 Supriya Karnik as Stage Coordinator
 Dalip Tahil as Kris Altar, Serina's father
 Mayuresh Wadkar as Vicky Singh
 Carla Dennis as Serina Altar, Kris' daughter
 Mridanjli Rawal as Ayesha
 Simran Mishrikoti

Release and critical reception
The Times Of India criticized the plot and the lack of subtlety in the film. The Indian Express gave the film 1.5/5 rating.

Soundtrack

The music for the film is composed by Tanishk Bagchi, with Dr. Zeus as a guest composer of a dance number. Lyrics are penned by Arafat Mehmood, Niket Pandey, Shabbir Ahmed, Mohammed Irfan and Jasmine Sandlas. Music rights have been acquired by T-Series.

The song "Chatur Naar" is a remake of the song "Ek Chatur Naar" from the 1969 Padosan. The song "Cheez Badi" is a remake of the song "Tu Cheez Badi Hai Mast Mast" from the 1994 film Mohra, which was itself a copy of the Qawwali song "Dam Mast Qalandar" by Pakistani singer Nusrat Fateh Ali Khan.

References

External links
 

2010s romantic thriller films
Films directed by Abbas–Mustan
2017 films
Films shot in Georgia (country)
Films scored by Tanishk Bagchi
Films scored by Dr Zeus
Films scored by Viju Shah
Indian romantic thriller films
2010s Hindi-language films